The 2007–08 Vancouver Canucks season was the Canucks' 38th season in the National Hockey League. After having reached the Western Conference Semi-Finals the previous year, Vancouver would fail to reach the playoffs.

Standings

Divisional standings

Conference standings

Schedule and results

Regular season

Player statistics

Skaters
Note: GP = Games played; G = Goals; A = Assists; Pts = Points; +/- = Plus/minus; PIM = Penalty minutes

Goaltenders
Note: GP = Games played; TOI = Time on ice; W = Wins; L = Losses; OT = Overtime/shootout losses; GA = Goals against; SO = Shutouts; SV% = Save percentage; GAA = Goals against average; G = Goals; A = Assists; PIM = Penalty minutes

†Denotes player spent time with another team before joining Vancouver. Stats reflect time with the Canucks only. ‡Denotes player no longer with the team. Stats reflect time with Canucks only.

Awards and records

2008 Canuck Awards winners
 Molson Cup - Roberto Luongo
 Cyclone Taylor Trophy - Roberto Luongo
 Cyrus H. McLean Trophy - Henrik Sedin
 Babe Pratt Trophy - Willie Mitchell
 Fred J. Hume Award - Alexandre Burrows
 Most Exciting Player Award - Alexandre Burrows

Markus Naslund
 Recorded his 500th career point as Canuck captain on October 26, 2007 at Washington.
 Recorded his 11th career NHL hat trick on November 21, 2007, at Minnesota. With the hat trick Naslund is tied with Tony Tanti for the most hat tricks by a Canuck player with 10.
 Recorded a four-game point streak November 16–21, scoring 6–2–8.
 Recorded an assist on December 5, 2007, at Chicago to become the all-time franchise leader with 725 points.
 Surpassed 800 career NHL points on December 27, 2007, vs. Calgary.
 Played in his 1,000th career NHL game on January 17, 2008, at Detroit.

Roberto Luongo
 Made 26 saves and established a club record by registering his third consecutive shutout on November 29, 2007, vs. Columbus.
 Was named the NHL's Second Star for November 2007, posting an 8–2–2 record, 1.56 GAA, .940 save percentage and four shutouts.
 Was named the NHL's first star of the week on December 3, 2007, after he posted a 2–1–0 record with a 0.67 goals-against average, a .976 save percentage and two shutouts from November 28-December 2.
 Was voted in by the fans to represent the Western Conference at the 2008 All-Star Game in Atlanta, as the starting goaltender. Eventually, Luongo decided to skip the All-Star Game to spend time with his pregnant wife in Florida.

Trevor Linden
 Recorded his 412th career Canuck assist on November 8, 2007 at Calgary to become the all-time franchise assists leader. Linden surpassed the previous record of 411 that was held by Stan Smyl.
 Played in his 1,100th game in a Canucks uniform on December 5, 2007 at Chicago.
 Was awarded the NHL Foundation Player Award on May 22, 2008, along with Tampa Bay's Vincent Lecavalier.

Henrik Sedin
 Played in his 500th career NHL and Canuck game on November 16, 2007 vs. Minnesota.
 Was selected by the NHL to represent the Western Conference at the 2008 All-Star Game in Atlanta.

Brendan Morrison
 Recorded his 300th career assist on October 6, 2007 at Calgary.
 Sustained a wrist injury, which ended his current NHL Ironman streak at 542 games.  His franchise leading Ironman streak stopped at 534 games on December 12, 2007.

Mattias Ohlund
 Recorded his 200th career NHL and Canuck assist on November 3, 2007 at Colorado.
 Scored a goal on December 15, 2007 at Edmonton to surpass Jyrki Lumme to become the all-time leader in goal scoring by a Canucks defenceman with 84 career goals.

Others
 Taylor Pyatt played in his 400th career game on November 9, 2007 vs. Colorado.
 Willie Mitchell played in his 400th career game on November 9, 2007 vs. Colorado.
 Brad Isbister played in his 500th career NHL game on November 16, 2007 vs. Minnesota.
 Daniel Sedin played in his 500th career NHL and Canuck game on November 23, 2007 at St. Louis.
 Jason Jaffray recorded his first career goal and assist in his NHL debut and was named third star of the game on December 12, 2007 at Anaheim.
 Alexander Edler was selected to represent the Western Conference at the 2008 YoungStars Game in Atlanta.
 Matt Cooke recorded an assist to earn his 200th career NHL and Canuck point on February 1, 2008 at Florida.
 Alexandre Burrows played in his 200th career NHL and Canuck game on March 25, 2008 at Calgary.

Transactions

Trades

Free agents acquiredFree agents lost

Received from waiversPlaced on waivers

Draft picks
Vancouver's picks at the 2007 NHL Entry Draft in Columbus, Ohio.

Farm teams

Manitoba Moose
AHL affiliate that is based in Winnipeg, Manitoba and their home arena is the MTS Centre. The team has been affiliated with the Vancouver Canucks since the 2000–01 AHL season.

Victoria Salmon Kings
ECHL affiliate that is based in Victoria, British Columbia and their home arena is the Save-On-Foods Memorial Centre. The team has been affiliated with the Vancouver Canucks since the 2006–07 ECHL season.

See also
 2007–08 NHL season

References
General

 Player stats: Vancouver Canucks player stats on espn.com
 Game log: Vancouver Canucks game log on espn.com
 Team standings: NHL standings on espn.com

Specific

2007-08
2007–08 in Canadian ice hockey by team
2007–08 NHL season by team